Théodore Wichwael, O.S.A. or Dietrich Wichwael (died 1519) was a Roman Catholic prelate who served as Auxiliary Bishop of Cologne (1504–1519).

Biography
Théodore Wichwael was appointed a priest in the Order of Saint Augustine. On 2 Aug 1504, he was appointed during the papacy of Pope Julius II as Auxiliary Bishop of Cologne and Titular Bishop of Cyrene. He served as Auxiliary Bishop of Cologne until his death on 3 Mar 1519.

References

External links and additional sources
 (for Chronology of Bishops) 
 (for Chronology of Bishops)  
 (for Chronology of Bishops) 
 (for Chronology of Bishops)  

16th-century German Roman Catholic bishops
Bishops appointed by Pope Julius II
1519 deaths
Augustinian bishops